Črečan may refer to:

Črečan, Međimurje County, a village near Čakovec, Croatia
Črečan, Zagreb County, a village near Sveti Ivan Zelina, Croatia